Comme un cheveu sur la soupe, is a French comedy film from 1957, directed by Maurice Regamey, written by Yvan Audouard, starring Louis de Funès. Shooting took place at the "Franstudio" film studios from December 26, 1956 until February 12, 1957. The film is known under the title: "Crazy in the Noodle" or "Kindly Kill Me" (USA).

Cast 
 Louis de Funès : Pierre Cousin, unsuccessful composer
 Noëlle Adam : Caroline Clément, the young woman who wants to commit suicide
 Jacques Jouanneau : Amédée, the bank clerk racegoer
 Robert Manuel : Tony, the  music lover
 Nadine Tallier : Juliette, the hostess of "La belle vie"
 Christian Duvaleix : the journalist
 Christian Méry : Angelo, the bandit complicates
 Louis Massy : the photographer from the newspaper
 Léo Campion : Mr Ferdinand Boutiller, impresario and editor of discs
 Pierre Stephen : the commissioner of police Bargeot
 Eddy Rasimi : porter at "La belle vie"
 Simone Berthier : Mrs Julie, the concierge of Pierre Cousin
 Hubert Deschamps : the  bank manager
 Géo Dorlis : the manager of the nightclub  "La belle vie"
 Albert Michel : the gasman 
 Roger Saget : the policeman who lends his trousers
 Pierre Tornade : Emile, a waiter at the nightclub
 Étienne Decroux : the crazy astrologer
 Judith Magre : A journalist

References

External links 
 
 Comme un cheveu sur la soupe (1957) at the Films de France

1957 films
French comedy films
1950s French-language films
French black-and-white films
Films directed by Maurice Régamey
1950s French films